T. M. Jobair is a Major General and currently serving as Director General of National Security Intelligence, the main civil intelligence agency in Bangladesh, since July 2018.

Career
In 2011, Jobaer served as a Director of National Security Intelligence. While serving as a director, he focused on the War on Terror and identified Hizb ut-Tahrir as the biggest threat among terror organizations in South Asia in an interview with The Outlook. Before taking over the charge of Director General, National Security Intelligence he was the Minister (counselor) of Bangladesh High Commission to the United Kingdom.

On 31 July 2018, Major General Jobaer was appointed Director General of National Security Intelligence replacing major general Md Shamsul Haque.   The Ministry of Public Administration transferred him from Bangladesh Army to the National Security Intelligence under the Prime Minister's Office. He made the welcome speech at the inauguration of the new headquarters of the National Security Intelligence in April 2021 which was inaugurated by Prime Minister Sheikh Hasina.

References

Living people
Bangladesh Army generals
Directors General of National Security Intelligence
Year of birth missing (living people)